Nicolaas Verkolje (11 April 1673, Delft – 21 January 1746, Amsterdam), was a Dutch painter and mezzotint maker.

Biography
According to Houbraken he was the son of Jan Verkolje and the only one of 5 children to carry on his art. Houbraken intended to write a biographical sketch of Nicolaas in his birth year of 1673, but never got that far (he died before publication of Volume III, which contains Jan Verkolje's biographical sketch).

According to the RKD both he and his brother Jan II became painters, having learned painting from their father. Nicolaas became the teacher of Jan Matthias Kok, Jan Maurits Quinkhard, Arnout Rentinck and Gerrit Zegelaar.

Nicolaes Verkolje made a portrait of Gabriel Metsu.

References

External links 
 

1673 births
1746 deaths
18th-century Dutch painters
18th-century Dutch male artists
Dutch male painters
Artists from Delft